Nikolai Morozov may refer to:
Nikolai Alexandrovich Morozov (1854–1946), Russian scientist and revolutionary
Nikolai Morozov (figure skater) (born 1975), figure skater
Nikolai Petrovich Morozov (1916-1981), Russian football coach
Nikolai Morozov (politician), Soviet politician, see Central Committee elected by the 26th Congress of the Communist Party of the Soviet Union